"Paint The Town Red" is a single from and the tenth track on Delirious?'s album, The Mission Bell. It was released on 10 October 2005 to iTunes UK and the two high street music stores Virgin and HMV. The single entered the UK Singles Chart at No. 56. This was their lowest hit ever, and the first not to reach the UK Top 40 since "White Ribbon Day".

Track listings
 "Paint the Town Red" (Album Version) - 2:19
 "Paint the Town Red" (Audiostar Re-Mix) - 3:02
 "Rain Down" (Audiostar Re-Mix) - 4:00

Chart performance

2005 singles
Delirious? songs
Songs written by Martin Smith (English musician)
Songs written by Stu G
2005 songs